Little Napoleons was a 1994 British television serial starring Saeed Jaffrey, Norman Beaton, Simon Callow and Lesley Manville as four politicians involved in local council elections. Beaton and Jaffrey played rival Labour candidates while Callow was their Conservative colleague.

External links
 

Channel 4 television dramas
1994 British television series debuts
1994 British television series endings
1990s British drama television series
British political drama television series
1990s British television miniseries
English-language television shows
Television shows set in the United Kingdom